Jean-Philippe Faure (born 17 November 1966 in Vernoux, France) is a football manager and former player who played as an attacking midfielder.

Since his retirement from playing in 2002, Faure has worked as a coach and manager. He managed French lower league clubs Thouars and La Roche. From March to May 2016 he served as interim manager of Ligue 2 side Chamois Niortais alongside Carl Tourenne, a role he again took up between December 2018 and January 2019.

External links

1966 births
Living people
French footballers
Association football midfielders
Ligue 1 players
Ligue 2 players
Championnat National players
Thonon Evian Grand Genève F.C. players
Le Puy Foot 43 Auvergne players
Olympique Alès players
ES Troyes AC players
Chamois Niortais F.C. players
CS Sedan Ardennes players
Scarborough F.C. players
French football managers
Ligue 2 managers
Chamois Niortais F.C. managers
French expatriate footballers
French expatriate sportspeople in England
Expatriate footballers in England